The RS Aero is a British sailing dinghy that was designed by Jo Richards as a one-design racer and first built in 2014.

Production
The design is marketed and distributed by RS Sailing of Romsey, United Kingdom.

Design
The RS Aero is a single-handed recreational sailboat, built predominantly of fiberglass. It has a cat rig, a raked stem, a vertical transom, a transom-hung rudder controlled by a tiller with a hiking stick extension and a retractable daggerboard. It displaces .

The Aero can be fitted with one of three different rig and sail sizes to accommodate a range of sailors of different weights.

Variants
RS Aero 5
This model was designed for children and small sailors and has  of sail.
RS Aero 7
This model was designed for medium weight sailors and has  of sail.
RS Aero 9
This model was designed for heavy weight sailors and has  of sail.

Operational history

The design has won several awards, including the 2014 Paris Boat Show Coup de Coeurs, the Netherlands 2015 HISWA Product of the Year Award and the 2015 Estonian Sailing Federation
Surprise Award.

The boat was also named the Sailing World Boat Of The Year in 2015, as Best One-Design. The magazine described it as "a stunning singlehander that is more than comparable to the Laser." It was cited for its "construction quality, lightweight hull, versatile rig with multiple combinations, technical details, and price".

In a 2014 review, George Yioulos, wrote, "sailing the Aero is unlike other boat I’ve evaluated before. It’s a designer’s brew of lightweight construction, precise craftsmanship, and clever design that allows for high quality production in multiple locations. While it’s still a single-person fiberglass dinghy, after a day on the water it’s more an extension of the sailor themselves than any other non-trapezing boat I’ve sailed." He further noted, "The Aero utilizes a unique mix of modern technology, all-around performance and very easy handling. Maybe it’s not ironic that these are similar to the characteristics that propelled the growth of the Laser some 40 years ago."

Events

See also
List of sailing boat types

Similar sailboats
Laser (dinghy)
Phantom (dinghy)

References

External links

RS Aero